Aleksandr Abramovich Kamensky (Александр Абрамович Каменский) (1922–1992) was a Soviet art critic and art historian. In 1954 he wrote an important article attacking the art establishment under Stalin.  he argued that artistic merit needed to be valued over ideological correctness. He would go on to write about and champion the works of artists such as Marc Chagall, and Martiros Saryan.

Selected bibliography 

 Konenkov (1962)
 Vernisages (1974)
 Nathan Altman (1978)
 Knightly Feat: A Book About The Sculpture of Anna Golubkina (1978) (reprinted as Anna Golubkina, Her Personality, And Age in 1990)
 Etudes on the Artists of Armenia (Erevan, 1979)
 Martiros Sarian (1987)
 Chagall: The Russian Years 1907-1922 (1988–1989)
 Romantic Montage (1989)
 The World of Art Movement in Early 20th Century Russia (with Vsevolod Nikolayevich Petrov)
 Oleg Tselkov (1992)
 Marc Chagall, An Artist From Russia (unabridged version of Chagall: The Russian Years published posthumously)

References

Soviet art critics
Soviet art historians
Soviet male writers
1922 births
1992 deaths
Burials in Troyekurovskoye Cemetery